The 1968–69 NBA season was the Rockets' 2nd season in the NBA.

In the playoffs, the Rockets lost to the Atlanta Hawks in six games in the Semifinals.

Roster

Regular season

Season standings

x – clinched playoff spot

Record vs. opponents

Game log

Playoffs

|- align="center" bgcolor="#ffcccc"
| 1
| March 27
| @ Atlanta
| L 98–107
| Elvin Hayes (31)
| Toby Kimball (15)
| Art Williams (6)
| Alexander Memorial Coliseum4,194
| 0–1
|- align="center" bgcolor="#ffcccc"
| 2
| March 29
| @ Atlanta
| L 114–116
| Rick Adelman (26)
| three players tied (9)
| Rick Adelman (6)
| Alexander Memorial Coliseum6,006
| 0–2
|- align="center" bgcolor="#ccffcc"
| 3
| April 1
| Atlanta
| W 104–97
| Elvin Hayes (26)
| Elvin Hayes (19)
| Rick Adelman (8)
| San Diego Sports Arena9,340
| 1–2
|- align="center" bgcolor="#ccffcc"
| 4
| April 4
| Atlanta
| W 114–112
| Elvin Hayes (30)
| Elvin Hayes (20)
| Don Kojis (4)
| San Diego Sports Arena12,337
| 2–2
|- align="center" bgcolor="#ffcccc"
| 5
| April 6
| @ Atlanta
| L 101–112
| Elvin Hayes (27)
| Elvin Hayes (9)
| Art Williams (8)
| Alexander Memorial Coliseum4,007
| 2–3
|- align="center" bgcolor="#ffcccc"
| 6
| April 7
| Atlanta
| L 106–108
| Kojis, Hayes (26)
| Toby Kimball (15)
| Adelman, Williams (6)
| San Diego Sports Arena10,117
| 2–4
|-

Awards and records
Elvin Hayes, NBA Scoring Champion
Elvin Hayes, NBA All-Rookie Team 1st Team

References

San Diego
Houston Rockets seasons